Claude de Rohan-Gié (1519-1579), was a French lady-in-waiting, foremost known for being the mistress to Francis I of France in 1539–40.

Early life
Claude was born in 1519 a member of the House of Rohan as the daughter of Charles de Rohan-Gié, vicomte de Fronsac (died in 1529) and the Italian noblewoman Giovanna dei Principi Sanseverino di Bisignano.

Later life
She was the mistress to Francis I of France in 1539–40. She was a lady-in-waiting to the queen, Eleanor of Austria, in 1530–37. She is the subject of several legendary stories and has been portrayed in fiction.

Personal life
Claude married two times. 
She was married in 1537 Claude de Beauvilliers, comte de Saint-Aignan (died in 1539); no issue. 
In 1541 she was married for the second time to Julien de Clermont-Savoie (died in 1563). They had one son:
 Gabriel de Clermont-Savoie (died in 1595); married Françoise de Noailles and had issue

Death
She died in 1579.

References 
 Alain Oudin, La vraie histoire du château de Maulnes qui comprend celle de Chambord, 200 pages, November 2008,

1519 births
1579 deaths
16th-century French people
Mistresses of Francis I of France
French ladies-in-waiting